The 21st AARP Movies for Grownups Awards, presented by AARP the Magazine, honored films and television shows released in 2021 created by and about people over the age of 50. The ceremony hosted by Alan Cumming was held on March 18, 2022, and was broadcast on PBS as part of its Great Performances series. This was Cumming's second time hosting, having also hosted in 2018 in the first year the awards were broadcast on PBS. Nominations were announced on January 11, 2022, in The Hollywood Reporter.

Awards

Winners and nominees

Career Achievement Award
 Lily Tomlin

Films with multiple nominations

References 

AARP Movies for Grownups Awards
AARP
AARP